Hunter Island may refer to:
 Hunter Island (Tasmania), Australia
 Hunter Island Group Important Bird Area, Australia
 Hunter Island (British Columbia), Canada
 Hunter Island (Ontario), Canada
Hunter Island, an island of Alaska, U.S.
 Hunter Island, New York, U.S.
 Matthew and Hunter Islands, uninhabited high islands in the South Pacific